The Gopher State-class crane ships of the United States Navy are a class of auxiliary vessels. The lead ship of the class is named in honor of the state of Minnesota.  Original United States Maritime Administration (MARAD) designation for the ship is C5-S-73b.

History 
All three vessels of the class were former Sea Witch-class container ships built at the Bath Iron Works for American Export-Isbrandtsen Lines. AEIL was acquired by Farrell Lines in 1978 and the ships were later returned to the Maritime Administration (MARAD) at an unknown date. They were converted for naval service as crane ships in 1986–1987.

All three ships are in MARAD Ready Reserve Force status in Newport News, Virginia.

Ships in class 
 SS Gopher State (T-ACS-4) was converted from the Export Leader, Bath Hull No. 358, IMO 7226689
 SS Flickertail State (T-ACS-5) was converted from the CV Lightning, Bath Hull No. 355, IMO 6817845
 SS Cornhusker State (T-ACS-6) was converted from the CV Stag Hound, Bath Hull No. 356, IMO 6916433

External links 
 Shipbuilding History page with information on Bath Iron Works hulls
 NavSource Gopher State (T-ACS-4)
 NavSource Flickertail State (T-ACS-5)
 NavSource Cornhusker State (T-ACS-6)
 Outboard Profiles of Maritime Administration  Vessels, The C5-Designs and his Conversions

 

 Gopher State class crane ship
Auxiliary ship classes of the United States Navy
 Gopher State class crane ship
Auxiliary transport ship classes
Type C5 ships